This is a list of women writers who were born in Ecuador or whose writings are closely associated with that country.

A
Carmen Acevedo Vega (1913–2006), poet, novelist, short story writer, journalist
Elysa Ayala (1879–1956), short story writer, painter

B
Ana Cecilia Blum (born 1972), novelist, journalist
Veronica Bonilla (born 1962), prolific children's writer, publishes in Spanish and English
Rosa Borja de Ycaza (1889–1964), playwright, novelist, poet, essayist, feminist
Aminta Buenaño (born 1958), short story writer, journalist, politician

C
Hipatia Cárdenas de Bustamante (1889–1972), novelist, poet, journalist, suffragist, feminist
Fanny Carrión de Fierro (born 1936), poet, critic, essayist, educator
María Piedad Castillo de Levi (1888—1962), poet, journalist, suffragist
Luz Argentina Chiriboga (born 1940) Afro-Ecuadorian essayist, poet, novelist
Mary Corylé (1894–1976), journalist, poet
Alicia Yánez Cossío (born 1928), poet, novelist, journalist

E
Ileana Espinel (1933–2001), poet, journalist, magazine editor 
Jenny Estrada (born 1940), historian, biographer, non-fiction writer, journalist

F
Carmen Febres-Cordero de Ballén (1829–1893), writer, poet

G
Karina Galvez (born 1964), Ecuadorian-American poet, writes in Spanish and English

H
Yanna Hadatty (born 1969), short story writer, essayist

I
Edna Iturralde (born 1948), acclaimed children's writer

L
Violeta Luna (born 1943), poet, novelist, essayist, critic, educator

M
Nela Martínez (1912–2004), politician, activist, poet, short story writer

R
Cristina Reyes (born 1981), poet, lawyer, and politician
Sonia Romo Verdesoto, poet, author of Ternura del aire (1963)
Lupe Rumazo (born 1933), essayist, short story writer, novelist

T
Doménica Tabacchi (born 1973), politician, journalist

U
Zoila Ugarte de Landívar (1864–1969), journalist, magazine editor, suffragist, feminist

V
Dolores Veintimilla (1829–1857), poet
Marieta de Veintemilla (1855–1907), first lady, non-fiction writer
Raquel Verdesoto (1910–1999), poet, biographer, feminist
Eugenia Viteri (born 1928), novelist, anthologist, teacher

See also
List of women writers
List of Spanish-language authors

References

-
Ecuadorian women writers, List of
Writers
Women writers, List of Ecuadorian